Hutchison Vale F.C. are a women's football team that play in the Scottish Women's Premier League, in SWPL2.

They also have a development squad playing in the second division of the SWFL.

In 2017, Hutchison Vale Ladies merged with Edinburgh University Ladies and were renamed Edinburgh University Hutchison Vale. During the merger the team played their home games at the Peffermill Sports Ground, Edinburgh. However this partnership ended at the end of the 2018 season, and they reverted to the Hutchison Vale name for 2019.

The club informed the league that they would not enter a women's team to the SWPL2 for the 2020 season.

History
Hutchison Vale Ladies won the Scottish Cup in 1993 & 1994.

Honours
Scottish Women's Cup
Winners : 1993, 1994
 Scottish Women's League, Division 1 (top tier)
 Winners : 1993-94

References

Women's football clubs in Scotland
Scottish Women's Premier League clubs
Football clubs in Edinburgh
Lothian Thistle Hutchison Vale F.C.